Jens Rasiejewski (born 1 January 1975) is a German football manager and former player who last managed VfL Bochum.

Career
Rasiejewski made his debut on the professional league level in the 2. Bundesliga for FSV Frankfurt on 1 October 1994 when he came on as a half-time substitute in a game against SV Meppen.

Career statistics

References

1975 births
Living people
Sportspeople from Marburg
German footballers
Germany youth international footballers
Germany under-21 international footballers
Germany B international footballers
Association football defenders
VfB Marburg players
Hannover 96 players
Eintracht Frankfurt players
FC St. Pauli players
VfB Stuttgart II players
Bundesliga players
2. Bundesliga players
Regionalliga players
VfL Bochum managers
2. Bundesliga managers
Footballers from Hesse
German football managers